The 2014–15 Virginia Cavaliers men's basketball team represented the University of Virginia during the 2014–15 NCAA Division I men's basketball season, in their 110th season of play. The team was led by head coach Tony Bennett, in his sixth year, and played their home games at John Paul Jones Arena as members of the Atlantic Coast Conference.

Building on the success of the previous season, the Cavaliers had their best regular season in program history with a record of 28–2, their first undefeated non-conference regular season record since 2000–01, and their highest national ranking since 1982–83, ranking at number two on the AP Poll for a total of seven weeks. The Cavaliers also became the first team outside of Tobacco Road to win back-to-back ACC regular season championships, with their conference record of 16–2. Particular highlights included holding Rutgers, Harvard, and Georgia Tech to under thirty points each. Virginia also held Harvard to a single field goal in the first half of their game, tying the NCAA record for fewest field goals allowed in the first half of a game since the shot clock was instituted in 1986. However, late-season injuries, in particular Justin Anderson's nearly five-week-long absence due to a broken finger and appendectomy, hurt the team, with the Cavaliers falling in a close loss to North Carolina in the ACC tournament semifinals. In the NCAA tournament they defeated Belmont in the second round before losing in the third round to Michigan State.

Last season
The Cavaliers finished the season 30–4 overall and 16–2 in conference play, finishing in first place in the ACC outright for the first time since the 1980–81 season. They proceeded to win the ACC tournament for their second-ever conference championship. The team also tied for the most wins in a season in school history, set a school record for the most single-season conference wins, and earned their highest final national ranking since 1982. The Cavaliers received a #1 seed in the NCAA tournament, where they defeated Coastal Carolina and Memphis before losing to Michigan State in the Sweet Sixteen.

Departures

Incoming transfers

Class of 2014 signees

Roster 
On November 7, 2014, head coach Tony Bennett announced, via a Virginia athletic department press release, that London Perrantes and Evan Nolte would be suspended for two scrimmages and the first game of the season due to a violation of team rules. Following the first game of the season against James Madison, Bennett stated that Jack Salt was "leaning" towards a redshirt, but he had not made a final decision yet.

On February 7, 2015, Justin Anderson suffered a broken finger in his left hand during the Louisville game. He had surgery the next day, and was expected to return to playing after four to six weeks, but an emergency appendectomy on March 5 kept him sidelined. Anderson returned to play seven days later, against Florida State in the ACC Tournament quarterfinals.

Depth chart

Schedule 

|-
!colspan=12 style="background:#; color:white;"| Non-conference regular season

|-
!colspan=12 style="background:#; color:white;"| ACC regular season

|-
!colspan=12 style="background:#; color:white;"| ACC Tournament

|-
!colspan=12 style="background:#; color:white;"| NCAA tournament

Rankings

On April 28, 2014, ESPN's preseason top-25 rankings listed Virginia at seventh in the nation. On August 11, Sporting News ranked Virginia eighth in their preseason poll.

Virginia's #2 ranking on Week 10 (January 12, 2015) was the first time Virginia was ranked in the top two nationally since the week of March 8, 1983.

Team players drafted into the NBA

Awards and honors
Awards by the Atlantic Coast Sports Media Association (ACSMA) were released on March 8. ACC coaches awards were released the following day,
 and then followed on March 10 with individual awards from the United States Basketball Writers Association. On March 16, USBWA released All-American selections, naming Brogdon to their second team. One week later, USBWA named Bennett the Henry Iba Award winner. On March 27, the National Association of Basketball Coaches released their District 2 awards. On March 30, the Associated Press and NABC named their All-American teams, including Brogdon on both organizations' second teams, and Anderson on the NABC third team.
 Tony Bennett
 Atlantic Coast Conference Men's Basketball Coach of the Year (ACSMA, ACC Coaches)
 USBWA District 3 Coach of the Year
 Henry Iba Award
 NABC District 2 Coach of the Year
 Justin Anderson
 All-ACC Second Team (ACSMA, ACC Coaches)
 USBWA All-District 3 Team
 NABC All-District 2 First Team
 NABC Third-Team All-American
 Darion Atkins
 ACC Defensive Player of the Year (ACSMA)
 ACC All-Defensive Team (ACSMA)
 Lefty Driesell Award
 Malcolm Brogdon
 ACC Co-Defensive Player of the Year (ACC Coaches)
 All-ACC First Team (ACSMA, ACC Coaches)
 ACC All-Defensive Team (ACSMA, ACC Coaches)
 USBWA All-District 3 Team
 All-ACC tournament Second Team
 USBWA Second Team All-American
 NABC All-District 2 First Team
 NABC Second Team All-American
 Associated Press Second Team All-American
 Anthony Gill
 All-ACC Third Team (ACSMA)
 ACC All-Defensive Team (ACC Coaches)
 London Perrantes
 All-ACC Honorable Mention (ACSMA)
 Mike Tobey
 ACC Sixth Man of the Year (ACC Coaches)

References

Virginia Cavaliers men's basketball seasons
Virginia
Virginia Cavaliers men's basketball
Virginia
2015 in sports in Virginia